There once were four direct railway routes between Liverpool and Manchester in the North West of England; only two remain, the two centre routes of the four. The most northerly and the most southerly of the four routes are no longer direct lines. Of the remaining two direct routes, the northern route of the two is fully electric, while the now southern route is a diesel-only line. The most northerly of the four has been split into two routes: the western section operated by Merseyrail electric trains and the eastern section by diesel trains, requiring passengers to change trains between the two cities. The fourth route, the most southerly of the four, has been largely abandoned east of Warrington; the remaining section caters mainly for freight trains.

The remaining two direct routes are:
This line follows the route of the original 1830 Liverpool and Manchester Railway.
 The southern route from  terminus via  to Manchester Piccadilly operates on lines formerly owned by the Cheshire Lines Committee.

Castlefield Junction allows crossover working between the northern route and Manchester Piccadilly.

Northern route (Chat Moss) 

The line follows George Stephenson's original 32-mile (51.5 km) Liverpool and Manchester Railway of 1830, which was the world's first inter-city passenger railway and the first to have run 'scheduled' services. Many early steam locomotives were initially used on this line including Stephenson's Rocket, which won the Rainhill Trials in 1829 (see List of Liverpool and Manchester Railway locomotives). The line also includes a number of listed structures including stations and bridges, particularly the Rainhill Skew Bridge and the nine-arch Sankey Viaduct. The line uses Class 319 electric EMU units.

Current services 

It is operated by Northern and continues to Manchester Airport.

Northern Trains is the dominant operator on the route, and its services are operated with Class 319 4-Car EMUs  or Class 150 and Class 156 Diesel Multiple Units (DMUs).  Transport for Wales services between Earlestown and Manchester Piccadilly are usually operated by Class 175 DMUs, but Class 158 units may be substituted on occasions.

From the May 2014 timetable change, a new hourly First TransPennine Express service from Newcastle Central to Liverpool Lime Street via York, Leeds, Huddersfield and Manchester Victoria was introduced. This service is operated by Class 185 DMUs and runs non-stop between Manchester Victoria and Liverpool Lime Street (32 minutes).

From the May 2018 timetable change, all TransPennine Express services to/from Liverpool now operate via the Northern route. After Manchester, the services usually go on to either Newcastle, Scarborough, York or Middlesbrough. They previously used the unelectrified Southern route, via Warrington Central.TransPennine Express to newcastle via Manchester are usually operated by Class 802, Transpennine Express services to Scarbrough via Manchester are usually operated by Mark 5A. Some Transpennine express services on the route also use Class 185.

The northern Liverpool to Manchester route is also used by East Midlands Railway for empty coaching stock (ECS) movements, and as a diversionary route when the southern route is closed.

Local trains also ran to Manchester via Leigh, but these services ceased in 1969 when the Eccles-Tyldesley-Leigh-Kenyon branch was closed as a result of the Beeching Axe. The northern Liverpool to Manchester line has also seen regular use over the years for diverted services from the West Coast Main Line when parts of the latter have been closed for engineering work, but diversions via Manchester instead have now become more common as they do not involve the train reversing, as would be necessary at Edge Hill, following the  electrification of the route.

Work to four-track the line between Huyton and Roby was completed in October 2017.

Technical details 
The key junctions on this route are:
 Edge Hill West Jn (to CLC line via Warrington Central)
 Edge Hill East Jn (to Edge Hill CS)
 Bootle Branch Jn (to Canada Dock Branch, leading to the docks)
 Olive Mount Jn (Olive Mount Jn Chat Moss to Regent Rd)
 Huyton Jn (to Wigan line)
 Earlestown West Jn (West Coast Main Line Southbound via Warrington Bank Quay)
 Earlestown East Jn (West Coast Main Line Southbound via Warrington Bank Quay)
 Newton-le-Willows Jn (for daily Wigan via Golborne Junction services)
 Parkside Jn  (for daily Wigan via Golborne Junction services)
 Eccles Station Jn (to the Weaste branch towards the Manchester Ship Canal)
 Ordsall Lane Jn (separates Chat Moss line (to Victoria) from Bolton lines (to Piccadilly) 

During a journey trains are controlled by:
 Lime Street control (LS) (Lime Street and the Lime Street tunnels) - now dedicated desk at new Manchester Rail Operating Centre (LL)
 Edge Hill signal box (LE) (Edge Hill to Edge Hill junction)
 Sandhills IECC (ML) (Olive Mount Jn To Regent Rd)
 Huyton signal box (HN) (Edge Hill to Huyton) - now dedicated desk at new Manchester Rail Operating Centre (LL)
 Warrington signal box (WN)
 Astley signal box (AY)
 Eccles signal box (ES)
 Manchester Piccadilly control (MP)
The above is likely to change in the future as various sections are migrated over to the control of the new Manchester Rail Operating Centre at Ashburys.

Electrification

From 5 March 2015, Class 319 trains started electric operation on this route from Liverpool to Manchester Airport via the Oxford Road viaduct.  Manchester Victoria station itself is now electrified and at the new timetable changeover on 17 May 2015 Liverpool to Manchester Victoria stopping services also began electric operation using the same rolling stock.

TransPennine Express Class 185 DMUs which formerly operated the Manchester Airport - Glasgow/Edinburgh service are now being redeployed to other routes.

The Department for Transport initially announced in July 2009 that the northern route of the Manchester to Liverpool line was to be electrified
with 25 kV, 50 Hz AC, overhead line. The electrification process was originally due to be completed by 2013 however, following a change of government in 2010, the work was delayed by the government meaning that, while the Manchester to Newton-le-Willows section was completed by December 2013 to enable Manchester - Scotland electric services, the remaining section to Liverpool was not completed until 5 March 2015. Now that the electrification of the line is complete and electric services are running, the journey time between Liverpool and Manchester has been reduced from around 45 minutes to 30 minutes due to the greater acceleration achieved by electric trains and the raising of the speed limit along the line from 75 to 90 mph.  Class 319 EMUs have been fully refurbished and transferred from the Thameslink route to operate between Liverpool and Manchester, while Thameslink services will be operated by new energy-efficient trains, which were originally due to be delivered between 2011 and 2013.
Electrification also offers electric haulage options for freight trains, giving a secondary route to the West Coast Main Line from Liverpool.

Southern route 

There are three passenger trains per hour (tph) in each direction between Liverpool and Manchester, which are usually operated by a variety of Class 150, Class 156 and Class 158 Diesel Multiple Units. TransPennine Express used to use modern Class 185 trains, before their services were diverted via the northern route. These services are run by a number of rail companies and the time intervals are not evenly spaced out; there are large gaps between some services, and at other times trains leave within minutes of each other. While East Midland Railway's once per hour service generally take 50 minutes to reach Manchester from Liverpool Lime Street, some Northern services take an hour and ten minutes to cover the 35 miles. This route is less busy than the northern route in terms of service frequency (1 express & 2 stopping trains per hour each way over the entire route.)

The line's newest station is Warrington West, which opened in December 2019. Liverpool South Parkway station opened in June 2006 after its estimated construction cost of £16 million had doubled to £32 million by the time it was completed.  This station replaced  and Garston stations and has frequent bus links to Liverpool John Lennon Airport. 

Originally this line ran from  terminus station to  terminus station built by the Cheshire Lines Committee (CLC) in 1873. Manchester Central closed in 1969 and is now the Manchester Central Convention Complex.

At the Liverpool end, the line from Hunts Cross to Central High Level station—which accessed the station via a tunnel—was given over to the Northern Line of the electric Merseyrail services and the line from Hunts Cross diverted in 1966 onto the short section of the West Coast Main Line to Lime Street station.

In 1977-8 the original line in the tunnel approaching Liverpool Central High Level terminus was dropped into a new lower level tunnel immediately south of the station to enter Liverpool Central underground station becoming a through line continuing underground to the north of Liverpool and onto Southport. The Low Level underground station and tunnel was built in 1890 to align with the approach tunnel to the High Level station if in the future the need was there. Victorian foresight was utilised nearly 80 years later.

The Liverpool to Warrington section of this line was initially scheduled to be on the Merseyrail electric urban network. The Strategic Plan for the North West, the SPNW, in 1973 envisaged that the Outer Loop which was to be an orbital line circling the city of Liverpool, the Edge Hill Spur which is a tunnel connecting the east of Liverpool to the central underground sections, and the lines to St. Helens, Wigan and Warrington would be electrified and all integrated into Merseyrail by 1991.  This meant that trains from Warrington would access Liverpool city centre's underground stations via the Northern Line and Liverpool Central underground station, giving access to Liverpool's shopping and business quarters. This never transpired; however, it is a long-term aspiration of Merseytravel.

The Liverpool City Region Combined Authority announced in July 2021 that trials of battery-electric Class 777 trains had been successful with the new units able to travel up to 20 miles on batteries. This opens up the possibilities of the trains being used to serve Warrington from Liverpool on this line, conforming to the original Merseyrail plan.

Planned electrification
Trains run on electrified track between the cities of Liverpool and Manchester on the Northern route (Chat Moss route), however only diesel engine propulsion can be used on the Southern route (Cheshire Lines route). This line has been prioritised for full electrification between the two cities, however no date has been set for the commencement of works.

Current services 
As of 2019, a half-hourly fast service operates between Liverpool Lime Street and Manchester Piccadilly, calling at Warrington Central and Manchester Oxford Road. One train per hour is operated by East Midlands Railway.

There are also several local services per hour operated by Northern Trains along the southern route to Manchester Oxford Road, extended to Manchester Piccadilly and Manchester Airport every hour. The Sunday service is two trains per hour, with one service calling at all stations and one running semi-fast.

East Midlands Railway mainly uses Class 158s along the line, although Class 153s and Class 156s are used sometimes. Northern Trains operates a mixture of Class 156 and Class 150 units along the line.

In the past, the CLC route was used by a variety of local services in addition to limited-stop expresses between the two cities. The latter route was closed as long ago as 1952. The diversion of Liverpool-bound trains to Lime Street in 1966 and the closure of Manchester Central in 1969 (all trains subsequently running to Oxford Road and Piccadilly) saw the route downgraded in importance and from then until the mid-1980s it was operated as a self-contained route due to congestion issues at the Manchester end. The service frequency was also lower than at present, for example the British Rail 1985 timetable showed one semi-fast and one stopping train per hour in each direction on weekdays (excluding the weekday peak periods). Through running to destinations east of Manchester via this route began on a regular basis only in 1986, when the opening of a new connection at  allowed trains from the Sheffield direction to run via Stockport and thus avoid conflicting movements across the station throat at Piccadilly.

The route from Liverpool to Manchester via Newton le Willows has been popular in recent years with steam locomotive-worked excursion trains. The second route from Liverpool through Hunts Cross and Warrington Central to Manchester rarely sees steam-worked excursion trains, the most recent being in 2013 for the 45th anniversary special run of the Fifteen Guinea Special. The original route through Newton-le-Willows was closed for electrification work.

Technical details 
The key junctions on this route are:
 Lime Street (used to move trains onto appropriate platform)
 Edge Hill East Junction (for the Huyton line)
 Allerton West Junction (to West Coast Main Line, known as Allerton junction)
 Hunts Cross Junction (to Merseyrail Northern Line)
 Glazebrook East Junction (formerly for Warrington-Stockport services, but now used as a passing point)
 Trafford Park Junction (for Euroterminal freight terminal)
 Castlefield Junction (where lines to Manchester converge).

During a journey trains are controlled by:
 Lime Street control (LS) (Lime Street and the Lime Street tunnels) - now dedicated desk at new Manchester Rail Operating Centre (LL)
 Edge Hill signal box (LE) (Edge Hill to Edge Hill junction)
 Allerton signal box (AN) (Edge Hill junction to Liverpool South Parkway)
 Hunts Cross signal box (HC) (Allerton junction to Widnes Station)
 Warrington Central signal box (WC) (Widnes station to Padgate station)
 Glazebrook East signal box (GE) (Birchwood station to Urmston)
 Manchester Piccadilly control (MP) (Urmston to route terminus)
The above is likely to change in the future as various sections are migrated over to the control of the new Manchester Rail Operating Centre at Ashburys.

Former direct routes

Via Kirkby
However, since 1977, this line requires a change at Kirkby, using the same platform, to change from the Merseyrail electric Northern Line trains to the Northern diesel trains. The terminus and interchange in 2023 is to be moved to Headbolt Lane, a new additional station in Kirkby. Sections of this route were built by the Lancashire and Yorkshire Railway and their acquired railways, such as the Liverpool and Bury Railway and the Manchester and Southport Railway.

This line was partially built by the Liverpool and Bury Railway, opening in 1848, which later merged into the Lancashire and Yorkshire Railway who on acquisition owned the Manchester and Southport Railway which formed the complete continuous line from Liverpool into Manchester. With the creation of the electric Merseyrail urban network the line was effectively cut into two with two different modes of traction. The Liverpool half is fast third rail electric and the Manchester side slower diesel traction. The point at which the two modes meet is Kirkby which functions as a terminus for the electric and diesel services.

The Merseyrail terminus at the Liverpool end of the line was extended from Liverpool Exchange to underground Liverpool Central.  With the closure of Liverpool Exchange terminus station in 1977, the terminus at the Liverpool end of the diesel service was cut back to Kirkby station. Passengers from Manchester alight at Kirkby walk down the same platform boarding a Liverpool bound electric train terminating at Liverpool's underground Central station. The diesel train from Manchester is scheduled to meet a Merseyrail electric train from Liverpool at Kirkby for ease of passenger transfers. A new underground through station was built at Moorfields replacing some of the services of nearby Liverpool Exchange terminus station.

At 37 miles (59.5 km) this route is longer than either of the two direct routes. According to National Rail Enquires website the travelling time from end to end would be 1 hour 38 minutes, including the change, compared with around 30 minutes from Lime Street to Manchester Piccadilly. However, for passengers who live near to the stations in the middle section of the line it may prove a quicker journey into Liverpool or Manchester.

Via Ditton Junction
A further southerly route, using what was St Helens and Runcorn Gap Railway and Warrington and Stockport Railway, connected Liverpool Lime Street with Manchester Oxford Road via Ditton Junction (south of Widnes), Warrington Bank Quay (low level platforms) and Timperley (north of Altrincham). East of Warrington the line has been abandoned and now forms part of the Trans Pennine Trail, and from Timperley into Manchester is now the Altrincham Line of the Manchester Metrolink tram system. Fiddlers Ferry Power station was decommissioned on 31 March 2020, leaving the line rarely used. What will become of the line between Widnes and Warrington is uncertain. Northern Powerhouse Rail have suggested the line be used to access Liverpool for both NPR & HS2.

Timings and line speeds 
,  the fastest journey times are around half an hour, which is little better than over a century earlier. The fastest recorded run was from Manchester Exchange to Liverpool Lime St in 30 minutes 46 seconds by a 1936 built Jubilee 5707 with 7 coaches. An 1882-built compound steam locomotive was timed on the same route in 38 minutes 18 seconds. Until 1968 trains from Liverpool to Manchester by all 3 routes were scheduled to take 40 minutes and often took less. The southern route via Warrington is now restricted to 85 mph and the northern route via Earlestown to 90 mph, with 75 mph over Chat Moss peat bog.

See also 
 Eccles rail crash (1941)
 Eccles rail crash (1984)

References

Further reading

External links 

 http://newton-le-willows.com : A Brief History of the Liverpool and Manchester Railway
 : A frequently updated photographic record of the electrification project

Rail transport in Cheshire
Rail transport in Greater Manchester
Rail transport in Merseyside
Railway lines in North West England